Arturo Carbonel Lomibao (born July 5, 1950) is a retired Filipino police officer. He served as Chief of the Philippine National Police (PNP) from March 14, 2005 to July 5, 2006, and retired with the rank of 4-star Police Director General.

Early life and education 
Lomibao was born in Brgy. Gueguesangen, Mangaldan, Pangasinan on July 5, 1950  to Juan Lomibao and Antonia Carbonel.

He completed his primary education at Gueguesangen Elementary, and secondary education at Mangaldan High School where he graduated Salutatorian.  He entered the University of The Philippines to pursue a degree in Engineering, but after two years, entered the Philippine Military Academy.  Lomibao graduated as part of the Masigasig Class of 1972 and was commissioned with the rank of 2nd Lieutenant in the now defunct Philippine Constabulary (PC) - at that time, one of the four military service branches of the Armed Forces of the Philippines (AFP) alongside the Philippine Army, Philippine Navy, and Philippine Airforce.

From late 1972–1974, Lomibao attended the Special Intelligence Training School in Fort Bonifacio, Rizal (now Taguig).

From 1990 to 1991, Lomibao attended the Command and General Staff Course at the General Staff College of the AFP, where he was later absorbed as a Police Superintendent following the merger of the PC and Integrated National Police (INP) into the Philippine National Police.

In 1996, Lomibao earned a master's degree in Public Administration from the Saint Louis College in San Fernando, La Union.

Military career 
Lomibao's initial posting was in Bontoc, Mountain Province in 1972, as an intelligence officer tasked to prepare operation plans and directives in the campaign against criminality and insurgency, namely against the New People's Army (NPA), the armed wing of the Communist Party of the Philippines (CPP).

From 1974 to 1976, Lomibao was assigned in San Fernando, Pampanga as Team Leader of a special task force under the direct command of 1PC Zone Commander Brigadier General Tomas Diaz; and later, Production Branch Chief of Zone 2's Intelligence Group. During this time, Lomibao conducted and oversaw numerous intelligence operations that led to the capture of hundreds of armed insurgents, including ranking members of local, regional, and national elements of the CPP/NPA.

Operation Scorpio 
In 1975, 1PC Zone launched an intelligence project code-named "OPERATION SCORPIO" to kill or capture Bernabé Buscayno, also known as Kumander Dante, founder and leader of the NPA. Lomibao, then a 1st Lieutenant assigned to the Intelligence Division of 1PC Zone, was the Agent Handler of the Source who had access to the target. After nearly one-year of painstaking intelligence build-up, Dante was captured in a surprise raid at a village in Mexico, Pampanga.  The successful mission dealt a serious blow to the local communist movement.  Immediately after Dante's capture, then President Ferdinand Marcos flew to Camp Olivas, and promoted Lomibao to the rank of Captain. For this feat, Lomibao earned the distinction of being the youngest captain then, in the post-war Armed Forces of the Philippines.

Effective dates of promotion

Police career

Effective dates of promotion

Decorations and Awards

Armed Forces 

 Distinguished Service Star
  Bronze Cross Medal - 3x
 Long Service Medal
 Military Civic Action Medal

 Luzon Anti Dissidence Campaign Medal
 Mindanao Anti-Dissidence Campaign Medal & Ribbon
 Philippine Republic Presidential Unit Citation Badge (PRPUCB)
 Martial Law Unit Citation
 People Power I Unit Citation
 Philippine Legion of Honor- Degree of Commander
 Combat Commander's (Kagitingan) Badge (CC(K)B) - 6th Level - Battalion Commander
 AFP Parachutist Badge

Law Enforcement

  Medalya ng Katapatan sa Paglilingkod (PNP Distinguished Service Medal) - 7x
  Medalya ng Paglilingkod (PNP Service Medal) - 2x
  Medalya ng Pambihirang Paglilingkod (PNP Special Service Medal) - 2x
  Medalya ng Kagalingan (PNP Medal of Merit) - 8x
  Medalya ng Kasanayan (PNP Efficiency Medal) - 5x
  Medalya ng Papuri (PNP Commendation Medal) - 6x
  Medalya ng Mabuting Asal (PNP Good Conduct Medal) - 3x
  Medalya ng Paglaban sa Manliligalig (PNP Anti-dissidence Campaign Medal) - 4x
  Medalya ng Paglilingkod sa Luzon (PNP Luzon Campaign Medal)
  Medalya ng Pagtulong sa Nasalanta (PNP Disaster Relief and Rehabilitation Operations Campaign Medal)
  People Power II Unit Citation

Others 

 Philippine Military Academy Alumni Association (PMAAA) Cavalier Award
 Ulirang Ama Award

References 

Philippine Constabulary personnel
People from Pangasinan
1950 births
Filipino police officers
Philippine Military Academy alumni
Recipients of the Philippine Legion of Honor
Filipino police chiefs
Filipino generals
Living people
Arroyo administration personnel